New Baltimore is a census-designated place (CDP) in Crosby Township, Hamilton County, Ohio. The population was 1,596 in the 2020 census.

History
The village, about four miles east of New Haven, was laid out in 1819 by mill owner Samuel Pottinger. In July 1863, Morgan's Raiders of the Confederate Army used a ford at New Baltimore to cross the Miami River.

Geography
It lies along the north bank of the Great Miami River.

References

Census-designated places in Hamilton County, Ohio
Census-designated places in Ohio
Populated places established in 1819
1819 establishments in Ohio